Azbar is a village in Gurab Pas Rural District, in the Central District of Fuman County, Gilan Province, Iran. At the 2006 census, its population was 691, in 175 families.

References 

Populated places in Fuman County